The Palestina Fault is a regional sinistral oblique thrust fault in the departments of Antioquia, Caldas and Bolívar in central Colombia.

Description 
The Palestina Fault extends from the Serranía de San Lucas in the department of Antioquia in the north, to the Nevado del Ruiz volcanic zone in the south. The Otú Norte and Bagre Norte Faults splay off the Palestina Fault. It mainly extends along the eastern slope of the Central Ranges, displacing Paleozoic crystalline metamorphic rocks and, in lesser amounts, Mesozoic plutonic rocks. The oldest rocks are mainly in the western block, which elevates a probable Miocene erosion surface whose eroded remnants are characterized by aligned flat narrow benches and spurs.

The fault forms outstanding slope break between the western uplifted block and the eastern peneplain surface. In the western block, there are flat bench-like remnants of a Tertiary erosion surface. The fault zone is characterized by fault scarps, saddles, linear ridges, displaced streams, shutter ridges, and aligned springs. Some topographic features show evidence of sinistral offset. Locally, two fault traces bound a depressed block (pull-apart basin). However, the Quaternary movement is believed to be sinistral. Before Miocene time, most of the faults of northern and western Colombia probably had dextral movement.

The main volcanoes Nevado del Ruiz, Nevado de Santa Isabel and Nevado El Cisne are located above the fault.

See also 

 List of earthquakes in Colombia
 Bucaramanga-Santa Marta Fault
 Romeral Fault System

References

Bibliography

Maps

Further reading 
 

Seismic faults of Colombia
Thrust faults
Strike-slip faults
Inactive faults
Faults
Faults
Faults